Michael Walsh (born 30 May 1986, Liverpool) is an English footballer.

Walsh joined Chester from Rhyl in 2004, making his first-team debut the following January as a substitute in an FA Cup tie at AFC Bournemouth in the left back slot. Walsh joined fellow youngsters Robbie Booth, Gavin Lynch and Shaun Whalley in being given first-team opportunities under Ian Rush. His Football League debut followed, again as a substitute at Cambridge United a week later, with his first goal arriving in a 2–2 draw against Southend United on 5 March 2005.

Despite his involvement in the first-team squad, Walsh and the majority of his teammates were released at the end of the season. He spent time on trial with Wrexham and briefly returned to Rhyl before joining Bangor City in September 2005.

He followed this with a two-year spell with Marfin Laiki League side APOP Kinyras Peyias. In 2011, he returned to Wales, rejoining Bangor City before moving to Aberystwyth Town in January 2012.

As a youngster, Walsh captained the North Wales under 18s side.

External links
welsh-premier.com profile
www.low.org.uk profile

References

1986 births
Living people
English Football League players
English footballers
Cymru Premier players
Association football fullbacks
Association football midfielders
Chester City F.C. players
Rhyl F.C. players
Bangor City F.C. players
APOP Kinyras FC players
Expatriate footballers in Cyprus
Footballers from Liverpool
Aberystwyth Town F.C. players